Wiwi may refer to:

Places
Mount Wiwi, a mountain in West Papua, Indonesia

People

Given name or nickname
Awilda Carbia or "Wiwi" Carbia (1938–2009), Puerto Rican actress
Wiwi-Anne Johansson (born 1950), Swedish politician
Wiwi Nguyễn Lê Hương Quỳnh (born ), Vietnamese contestant on Supermodel Me (season 6)
"Wiwi" Arão Manuel Lologi, Angolan footballer on the 2020–2021 F.C. Bravos do Maquis lineup

Surname
Brant Wiwi, American competitor in the 2006 AMA Superbike Championship
Pertiwi Wiwi, Indonesian competitor in karate at the 2013 Southeast Asian Games

Other uses
Wīwī, several species of rushes and sedges found in New Zealand
WIWI-LP, a low-power FM radio station licensed to Milwaukee, Wisconsin

See also

WI (disambiguation)